The 2021 NCAA Division II football season, part of college football in the United States organized by the National Collegiate Athletic Association (NCAA) at the Division II level, began on August 28 and ended December 18 with the Division II championship at the McKinney Independent School District Stadium in McKinney, Texas.

Conference changes and new programs

Membership changes

Conference standings

Super Region 1

Super Region 2

Super Region 3

Super Region 4

Postseason

Bracket

Super Region 1

Super Region 2

Super Region 3

Super Region 4

National semifinals
Teams that advanced to the semifinals were re-seeded.

See also
2021 NCAA Division I FBS football season
2021 NCAA Division I FCS football season
2021 NCAA Division III football season
2021 NAIA football season

References